Brian Marsden may refer to:

 Brian Marsden (rugby league), rugby league footballer of the 1960s
 Brian Marsden (weightlifter) (born 1947), weightlifter from New Zealand
 Brian G. Marsden (1937–2010), British astronomer